General elections to the States were held in Alderney on 25 November 2006 in accordance with the rules governing elections in Alderney. All five elected members were independents.

Results

|-
!style="background-color:#E9E9E9" align=left valign=top width=400|Candidates
!style="background-color:#E9E9E9" align=right|Votes
|-
|align=left|Colin Williams (Elected)
|align="right" |654
|-
|align=left| Ian Tugby (Elected)
|align="right" |627
|-
|align=left|Richard Willmott (Elected)
|align="right" |461
|-
|align=left|Liz Bennett (Elected)
|align="right" |424
|-
|align=left|Richard Cox (Elected)
|align="right" |352
|-
|align=left|Jeremy Sanders
|align="right" |319
|-
|align=left|John Postlethwaite
|align="right" |294
|-
|}

References

External links
Alderney Government

2006
Alderney
2006 in Guernsey
November 2006 events in Europe